Varinder Singh (16 May 1947 – 28 June 2022) was an Indian field hockey player.

He won a bronze medal at the 1972 Summer Olympics in Munich. He also competed at the 1976 Summer Olympics.

Singh died on 28 June 2022 at a hospital in Jalandhar, at the age of 75.

References

External links 
 
 

1947 births
2022 deaths
Olympic field hockey players of India
Field hockey players at the 1972 Summer Olympics
Field hockey players at the 1976 Summer Olympics
Indian male field hockey players
Olympic bronze medalists for India
Olympic medalists in field hockey
Asian Games medalists in field hockey
Field hockey players at the 1974 Asian Games
Field hockey players at the 1978 Asian Games
Medalists at the 1972 Summer Olympics
Recipients of the Dhyan Chand Award
Asian Games silver medalists for India
Medalists at the 1974 Asian Games
Medalists at the 1978 Asian Games
Field hockey players from Jalandhar